Angiopoietin-related protein 7 is a protein that in humans is encoded by the ANGPTL7 gene.

It is one of the 8 angiopoietin-like proteins.

Rare protein-altering variants in ANGPTL7, including p.Gln175His (0.007 minor allele frequency in Non-Finnish European population) and p.R220C (0.048 minor allele frequency in Finland), lower intraocular pressure and protect against glaucoma.

References

Further reading

External links